The 1986–87 Edmonton Oilers season was the Oilers' eighth season in the NHL, and they were coming off a heart breaking playoff loss to the Calgary Flames the year before, ending the Oilers' bid for a third-straight Stanley Cup. Edmonton won the Presidents' Trophy, as they finished with 106 points and won their sixth straight Smythe Division title. There was no postseason upset this year, as Oilers defeated the Philadelphia Flyers in the Final to win their third Stanley Cup in four years, although the Flyers did push the Finals series to seven games.

As of  this is the Oilers' most recent division title, making it the longest such active drought in the North American major professional sports leagues. Nevertheless, Edmonton would go on to win two more Stanley Cups over the next three seasons.

Regular season
Wayne Gretzky led the league with 183 points, earning his seventh Art Ross Trophy and win his eighth Hart Trophy. Jari Kurri finished with 54 goals and 108 points, while Mark Messier had a career high 107 points. Esa Tikkanen had a break out season, getting 78 points, including 34 goals, along with 120 penalty minutes. Paul Coffey missed 21 games but still finished with 67 points to lead Oilers defencemen.

In goal, Grant Fuhr and Andy Moog once again split time, with Moog leading the team with 28 wins, while Fuhr posted a team best 3.44 GAA.

Season standings

Schedule and results

Playoffs

In the playoffs, the Oilers got a bit of a scare in their opening game against the Los Angeles Kings, losing 5–2, but Edmonton rebounded, winning game two by a 13–3 score and won eight games in a row to get past the Kings and sweep the Winnipeg Jets in the process. Edmonton had little trouble getting past the Detroit Red Wings in the Conference Final, defeating them in five games and faced the only other 100-point team in the NHL in the Stanley Cup Final, the Philadelphia Flyers. The series went the full seven games, with Edmonton winning the seventh and deciding game by a 3–1 score to capture their third Stanley Cup in the past four years. No Oiler won the Conn Smythe Trophy, as Ron Hextall of the Flyers won it despite failing to win the Stanley Cup.

Player statistics

Regular season
Scoring leaders

Goaltending

Playoffs
Scoring leaders

Goaltending

Awards and records

Awards

Records
 177: A new NHL record for most career points in a playoffs by Wayne Gretzky on April 9, 1987.
 9: A new NHL record for most career short-handed goals in a playoffs by Mark Messier on May 22, 1987.
 5: Tied NHL record for most game-winning goals in a playoffs by Jari Kurri on May 31, 1987.

Milestones

Transactions

Trades

Free agents

Draft picks
Edmonton's draft picks at the 1986 NHL Entry Draft

References

 National Hockey League Guide & Record Book 2007

Edmonton Oilers season, 1986-87
Edmon
Edmonton Oilers seasons
Presidents' Trophy seasons
Smythe Division champion seasons
Stanley Cup championship seasons
Western Conference (NHL) championship seasons
Edm